Rahul Rawat (born 3 October 1996) is an Indian cricketer. He made his first-class debut for Uttar Pradesh in the 2018–19 Ranji Trophy on 15 January 2019.

References

External links
 

1996 births
Living people
Indian cricketers
Uttar Pradesh cricketers
Place of birth missing (living people)